Edward B. McClain Jr. was a Liberian politician. He was the minister of state for presidential affairs and chief of staff to President Ellen Johnson Sirleaf.

He was born on 18 November 1944. His father's family was from Mhanwruune Quarter of Picnicess, in Grand Kru County. He was a nephew on his mother's side of President William Richard Tolbert Jr. McClain graduated from the College of West Africa and Cuttington College and Divinity School with a BSc degree in chemistry and biology. He then studied psychiatry at the University of Besançon in France. He then resided in Abidjan, in the Ivory Coast, where he befriended Johnson Sirleaf.

Johnson Sirleaf and McClain returned to Liberia in 2003. He was a key member of her electoral campaign.

McClain died on 23 July 2016 while undergoing medical treatment in Pretoria, South Africa.

References

1944 births
2016 deaths
Liberian politicians